The A Northern Neck District is a high school conference in the state of Virginia that comprises high schools in the Northern Neck of Virginia.  The Northern Neck District schools compete in A Region A with the schools from the A/AA Eastern Shore District, the A Tidewater District, and the A Tri-Rivers District of the Virginia High School League.

Member schools
 Essex High School of Tappahannock, Virginia
 Lancaster High School of Lancaster, Virginia
 Northumberland High School of Heathsville, Virginia
 Rappahannock High School of Warsaw, Virginia
 Washington & Lee High School of Montross, Virginia
 Colonial Beach High School of Colonial Beach, Virginia

Virginia High School League
Northern Neck